Martinac may refer to:

Places
 Martinac, Čazma, a village near Čazma, Bjelovar-Bilogora County, Croatia
 Martinac, Veliko Trojstvo, a village near Veliko Trojstvo, Bjelovar-Bilogora County, Croatia

Other uses
 Martinac (priest), 15th-century Croatian Glagolite scribe

People with the surname
Paula Martinac (born 1954), American writer